Marvel Rising is an American media franchise which was produced by Marvel Animation from 2018 to 2019, based on characters from Marvel Comics. The franchise focused on the Secret Warriors, a diverse team of teenage superheroes who must band together to defend the world from powerful threats.

History
The franchise was first announced in December 2017 and consists of a television film, a series of shorts and Marvel Comics books to be announced later with additional television specials scheduled to follow.

The franchise was launched with a series of comic books, beginning in April 2018 with Marvel Rising No. 0 for free, with following monthly issues starting in June. A series of six four-minute shorts, titled Marvel Rising: Initiation, were released on August 13, 2018 in advance of the television film, Marvel Rising: Secret Warriors, which premiered on September 30, 2018. On August 23, 2018, the film's theme song, "Born Ready", was released on Walt Disney Records' YouTube channel.

Following the premiere of Secret Warriors, on October 2, 2018, Marvel announced two new Marvel Rising specials, Chasing Ghosts and Heart of Iron, for future release. March 2019 saw the release of the next short film series, Marvel Rising Ultimate Comics and a self titled comic book mini-series for the franchise. At the March 2019 WonderCon, Marvel announced three additional specials, Battle of the Bands, Operation Shuri, and Playing With Fire, to be streamed on Marvel HQ YouTube channel later in the year.

Cast

Animated media

Initiation
A series of six four-minute shorts, titled Marvel Rising: Initiation, were released in advance of the film. The shorts focus on Ghost-Spider, who is on the run after being framed for the murder of her friend Kevin while Quake and Patriot, as well as Ms. Marvel and Squirrel Girl, attempt to bring her in. Written by Mairghread Scott, Initiation aired on August 13, 2018, on Disney XD. The episodes are grouped into three arcs: a Gwen Stacy solo, a Ms. Marvel/Squirrel Girl team-up, and a S.H.I.E.L.D. pursuit.

Secret Warriors

The main entry in the franchise, Marvel Rising: Secret Warriors, was announced alongside the franchise in December 2017. The film tells the story of how the Secret Warriors are initially drawn together following a string of Inhuman-related violence, and must work together to stop Hala the Accuser and her Kree forces.

The movie was first announced on December 7, 2017, and aired on September 30, 2018. Joe Quesada, Dan Buckley, Cort Lane, and Eric Radomski executive produce the film, with Stan Lee, Sana Amanat, and Marsha Griffin credited as co-executive producers. It was written by Mairghread Scott, with Alfred Gimeno as supervising director.

Specials
The first two specials Chasing Ghosts and Heart of Iron were announced by Marvel on October 2, 2018, following the premiere of Secret Warriors; these specials revolve around the Secret Warriors settling unfinished business with their enemies from the film.

The next three specials, Battle of the Bands, Operation Shuri, and Playing With Fire, were later announced at the March 2019 WonderCon; these specials introduced new villains to the series.

As of 2022, no new specials are set to be released, with Playing with Fire being the last one.

 Marvel Rising: Chasing Ghosts is a 22-minute special written by Mairghread Scott. It was released on January 16, 2019 on the Marvel HQ YouTube channel, and later on February 1 on the DisneyNOW app. It continues Ghost-Spider's story from the Initiation shorts, in which she joins forces with the Secret Warriors to stop Exile and Sheath (who previously made an unvoiced appearance in Initiation), during which Quake helps Ghost-Spider clear her name for Kevin's death.
 Marvel Rising: Heart of Iron is a 44-minute special written by Margaret Dunlap. It was released on the Marvel HQ YouTube channel on April 3, 2019. It introduces the character Ironheart, who is having difficulty adjusting to her new college life as the youngest student there. When Hala the Accuser demolishes the college's engineering lab and kidnaps Riri's best friend, the artificial intelligence A.M.I., Riri takes inspiration from Iron Man and develops a plan with help from the Secret Warriors to save her friend.
 Marvel Rising: Battle of the Bands is a 22-minute special written by Mae Catt. It premiered on August 23, 2019 at D23 Expo, and was later released on the Marvel HQ YouTube channel on August 28. It features Ghost-Spider assisting the Secret Warriors looking into mysterious attacks involving the sonic-powered Screaming Mimi. However, the investigation may keep Gwen from her band's competition.
 Marvel Rising: Operation Shuri is a 22-minute special also written by Mae Catt. It premiered on October 6, 2019 at New York Comic Con, and was later released on the Marvel HQ YouTube channel on October 11. It introduces Black Panther's younger sister Shuri, who attempts to hang out with the Secret Warriors as a normal teen.
 Marvel Rising: Playing with Fire is a 44-minute special written by Danielle Wolff. It was released on the Marvel HQ YouTube channel on December 18, 2019. It focuses on Inferno, whose powers get stolen by a teenage criminal named Zayla, and America Chavez, who attempts to connect with Ms. Marvel. The Secret Warriors attempt to get Inferno's powers back while Inferno is conflicted as to whether he actually wants his powers back.

Ultimate Comics
Announced in February 2019, a series of six animated videos were released on the Marvel HQ YouTube channel from February 20, 2019 to March 27, 2019. The shorts are between six and seven minutes long and were released weekly. Titled Marvel Rising Ultimate Comics, the videos combine comic book-style art with digital motion effects. The first is subtitled and features Ms. Marvel going up against Loki when he interrupted her field trip.

Reception

Critical reception

Marvel Rising: Initiation 
The review aggregator website Rotten Tomatoes reported an approval rating of 83%, with an average rating of 7.0/10, based on 6 reviews.

Meagan Damore of CBR.com called Marvel Rising: Initiation "full of charm and spunk," writing, "Marvel Rising: Initiation is a fun, approachable series filled with characters that will make viewers instantly fall in love. Existing fans will find a lot to like here, but even those unfamiliar with these characters will have no problem immersing themselves in this world. Like Cameron said in an earlier interview with CBR, the animated series truly has something for everybody. Marvel Rising: Initiation is a must for Marvel fans." Kevin Yeoman of Screen Rant described "Marvel Rising: Initiation as a "series of episodic shorts with an emphasis on inclusivity," stating, "Initiation lives up to its title, offering an entertaining beginning to a much larger story, one that puts a welcome emphasis on themes of inclusion and empowerment for a younger audience. But, like with Marvel’s other animated offerings, there’s still plenty for older viewers to enjoy as well. From the action-heavy storytelling to the obvious connection with the larger (animated) MCU, Marvel Rising: Initiation has a little something for everyone, from the hardcore Marvel-ites to those in search of heroes they can relate to."

Paige S. Allen of IGN gave Marvel Rising: Initiation a grade of 8 out of 10, stating, "Marvel Rising: Initiation shines as a promising introduction to Marvel’s next class of superheroes, which is made up by richly-characterized female leads. While some viewers might lament the series’ watered-down adaptation of its source material, or find that other shows have better mastered its themes, overall Marvel Rising: Initiation has enough enjoyable material to keep new and seasoned fans alike interested in the forthcoming Marvel Rising universe." Emily Ashby of Common Sense Media gave Marvel Rising: Initiation a grade of 4 out of 5 stars, complimented the depiction of positive messages and role models, citing diversity, thoughtfulness, and cleverness, asserting, " Most of the heroes introduced in this story are females, and the diversity that's evident in their personalities and physical appearances challenges the concept that TV superheroes must look and sound alike (i.e., be thin and shapely and fight crime in skimpy outfits)."

Marvel Rising: Secret Warriors 
The review aggregator website Rotten Tomatoes reported an approval rating of 100%, with an average rating of 7.5/10, based on 7 reviews.

Kevin Yeoman of Screen Rant called Marvel Rising: Secret Warriors an "entertaining animated film," saying, "The movie makes a good go of telling a larger story within the confines of a feature-length runtime. There are concessions to be made, however, and they mostly have to do with Kamala’s home life and the development of America Chavez, whose introduction and origin story feel too hasty for what the character deserves. With any luck this won’t be the last fans see of these Secret Warriors, and Disney XD will have another chance to make these characters shine." Megan Damore of CBR.com described Marvel Rising: Secret Warriors as a "fluid transition from the Marvel Rising: Initiation shorts," writing, "With vibrant characters, a heartwarming story and a killer soundtrack, Marvel Rising: Secret Warriors is a joy to watch. In a post-Avengers: Infinity War world, Secret Warriors is like a shot in the arm, brimming with hope and heart. It's rare to find a project so genuine and candid these days, and Secret Warriors manages to pull this off without feeling cheesy or over-sentimental. Even when the credits roll on the feature, it doesn't feel like the end -- not even close. Instead, Marvel Rising: Secret Warriors feels like the bold beginning of a new era for Marvel Animation."

Chelsea Steiner of The Mary Sue referred to Marvel Rising: Secret Warriors as an "entertaining, warm-hearted celebration of diversity and inclusion," asserting "The story of a young superhero struggling to understand and master their powers is not a new one (we’ve had nearly a dozen Spider-Man films covering this terrain), but seeing two girls (one a woman of color) navigating the experience is refreshingly original. The film is packed with powerful female characters, but the story is centered on the friendship between Kamala and Doreen. Kamala’s hesitancy and reserve make her a great foil for the upbeat and wildly optimistic Doreen." Emily Ashby of Common Sense Media gave Marvel Rising: Secret Warriors a grade of 4 out of 5 stars, praised the depiction of positive messages, citing teamwork and perseverance, and complimented the presence of role models, stating the film depict leading and inspiring female characters, while noting the diverse ethnicity across the characters, stating, "The characters' emotional evolution from insecure and standoffish teens to powerful gears in the Secret Warriors machine involves strong themes about self-identity, confidence, cooperation, and embracing one's own uniqueness. Another plus? This Marvel installation makes heroes of several female characters (yay!) who don't fit the archetypal physical template of traditional heroines and bring body type diversity to the mix (double yay!)."

In other media

Comics

 A comic book title for the franchise was launched with the release on April 25, 2018, with Marvel Rising No. 0 for free by writer Devin Grayson, with artist Marco Failla featuring the first team up of Squirrel Girl and Ms. Marvel. Regular issues began in June and were written by Grayson, G. Willow Wilson and Ryan North. Each issue had a different subtitle, all numbered issue 1—for example, in June it was Marvel Rising: Alpha issue 1, Marvel Rising: Squirrel Girl & Ms. Marvel issue 1 on August 1, followed shortly thereafter by Marvel Rising: Ms. Marvel & Squirrel Girl issue 1. The series concluded with Marvel Rising: Omega issue 1 on September 12. This was "criticized as being overly complicated and confusing" by Comics Worth Reading. The series was collected into a single 168-page graphic novel, simply titled "Marvel Rising", which was released in November 2018.

 A Marvel Rising five issue mini-series was released starting in March 2019. The series has the heroes facing off with sorceress Morgan le Fay, who is attempting to turn New Jersey into New Camelot. Creative crew was writer Nilah Magruder, artist Roberto Di Salvo, and Audrey Mok on cover art.

Young Storytellers event

 With the Young Storytellers nonprofit organization, Marvel announced on August 13, 2018, that a live event would be hosted at which students (ages 11 to 13) would work with mentors to develop a three to five-page script featuring Marvel Rising characters. The voice actors would then perform them to be posted to Marvel YouTube channel in the third quarter.

Music
 On August 23, 2018, "Born Ready", the theme song for Marvel Rising: Secret Warriors, was released on Walt Disney Records VEVO YouTube channel. The song is sung by Dove Cameron, who plays Ghost-Spider in other Marvel Rising media.
 "Side by Side", a song from Marvel Rising: Chasing Ghosts, was released January 18, 2019, two days after the special, on DisneyMusicVEVO YouTube channel. The song is sung by Sofia Wylie, who plays Ironheart in other Marvel Rising media
 "Team", a song from Marvel Rising: Heart of Iron, was released May 2, 2019, on DisneyMusicVEVO. The song is sung by Tova.
 "Natural Disaster", a song from Marvel Rising: Battle of the Bands, was released October 3, 2019. This song is also sung by Tova.
 "Roaring Thunder", a song from Marvel Rising: Playing with Fire, was released December 19, 2019. This song is sung by Navia Robinson, who plays Zayla in the same special.

Merchandise

 In September 2018, Hasbro unveiled its Marvel Rising toy line that consists of three varieties of figures and the Ghost-Spider Web Slinger targeting kids ages 6 and up.  All were released in October 2019. One variety is the Training Outfit Doll line of 11-inch five points articulation figures in training outfits at the lowest price point. Another variety is the main line with 11-inch 15 points articulation figures in superhero costumes at a mid price point. The Secret Identity Doll are 11-inch 11 points articulation figures with two outfits at the highest price point.

References

External links 
 

Animated films based on Marvel Comics
Anime-influenced Western animation
Marvel Entertainment franchises
Mass media franchises introduced in 2018
Marvel Animation